Kunikov is a Russian male surname, its feminine counterpart is Kunikova. Notable people with the surname include:

Caesar Lvovich Kunikov (1909–1943), Soviet naval officer
2280 Kunikov, a minor planet named after him
Russian ship Caesar Kunikov (BDK-64) 

Russian-language surnames